Elder Glacier is a tributary glacier entering the Tucker Glacier just west of Oread Spur, in the Victory Mountains of Victoria Land. It was mapped by the United States Geological Survey (USGS) from surveys and U.S. Navy air photos, 1960–62, and was named by the Advisory Committee on Antarctic Names for William C. Elder, a topographic engineer who was a member of the USGS Topo North–South party that surveyed the area, 1961–62.

References 

Glaciers of Victoria Land
Borchgrevink Coast